Arturo Mora Ortiz (born 24 March 1987) is a Spanish former road cyclist, who rode professionally from 2010 to 2011 for .

Major results
2003
 1st  Road race, National Novice Road Championships
2005
 1st  Road race, National Junior Road Championships
2007
 1st Overall Vuelta a Palencia
1st Stage 3
2008
 1st Overall Vuelta a Palencia
1st Stage 5
2009
 1st Stage 3 Tour of Galicia
 3rd Time trial, National Under-23 Road Championships
2010
 1st Stage 1 Vuelta Ciclista a León
2011
 1st  Turkish Beauties classification, Tour of Turkey

References

External links

1987 births
Living people
Spanish male cyclists
Sportspeople from the Province of Ciudad Real
Cyclists from Castilla-La Mancha